Somerset (Ward 14) is a city ward in the city of Ottawa, Ontario, Canada. It covers the neighbourhoods of Downtown Ottawa, Centretown, Lebreton Flats and most of Centretown West. It is Ottawa's smallest and most dense ward. It is represented on Ottawa City Council by Ariel Troster. It has an area of 6.5 km² and a projected 2006 population of 38,500. According to Canada 2001 Census it had a population of 36,365. The ward was created in 1994 when Dalhousie Ward and Wellington Ward were merged.

City councillors
Elisabeth Arnold (1994-2003)
Diane Holmes (2003-2014)
Catherine McKenney (2014–2022)
Ariel Troster (2022–present)

Population data

Languages (mother tongue):

English: 60.2%
French: 9.9%
Chinese: 7.9% (inc. Mandarin, Cantonese and Chinese)
Vietnamese: 1.9%
Arabic: 1.8%
Italian: 1.7%
Spanish: 1.6%

Religion:
Roman Catholic: 36.0%
No religion: 27.3%
Anglican: 6.7%
United Church: 5.2%
Muslim: 4.7%
Buddhist: 3.5%
Presbyterian: 1.3%
Baptist: 1.3%
Jewish: 1.0%
Greek Orthodox: 1.0%

Income:
Average household income: $51,319
Average income: $36,042

Election results

1994 elections
Arnold defeated Harris in a rematch of the 1991 election in Dalhousie Ward for city council.

1997 elections

2000 Ottawa municipal election

2003 Ottawa municipal election

2006 Ottawa municipal election

2010 Ottawa municipal election
Diane Holmes is running for re-election against Don Fex, a former festival production manager and manager of a local book store, Susan Miller, a former elected School Commissioner for the Western Quebec School Board 2007, and Barkley Pollock, an unsuccessful mayoral candidate from 2006 election, and past supporter of Liberal candidate Richard Mahoney.

2014 Ottawa municipal election
Source

2018 Ottawa municipal election

2022 Ottawa municipal election

References

External links
 Map of Somerset Ward

Ottawa wards